A quarto is a book whose production entails printing 4 (generally non-consecutive) pages per impression.

 Early quarto texts of Shakespeare's works:
Folios and Quartos
Bad quarto

 Quarto Group, a London-based publishing house

 Quarto, a traditional British paper size

Places of Italy
 Municipalities in respective provinces:
 Quarto, Campania, in Naples
 Quarto d'Altino,  in Treviso
 Quartu Sant'Elena, in Cagliari
 Quarto Cagnino, in Milan
 Quarters in respective cities:

 Quarto Oggiaro, in Milan
 Quarto dei Mille, in Genoa
 Hamlets:
 Quarto d'Asti, in Asti (AT)

 Quarto Chilometro, in Colleferro (RM)

Other 
 Quarto (board game)
 Quarto (Gibraltar), obsolete coin with value of  Gibraltarian real
 Italian cruiser Quarto, an Italian scout cruiser

See also

Cuarto (disambiguation)
Quatro (disambiguation)
Cuatro (disambiguation)
Quattro (disambiguation)